Glen Huntly Road is a main road in Melbourne, Victoria. It starts at Beach Road, Elwood, runs east–west through Elsternwick, Caulfield, Glen Huntly and ends in Carnegie.

Glen Huntly Road was named after the emigrant ship Glen Huntley from Greenock, Scotland, which landed in Hobsons Bay in Melbourne on 17 April 1840. Many of its passengers had died from fever and were buried in the St Kilda Cemetery.

Glen Huntly Road crosses two railway lines; the Sandringham line at Elsternwick station and the Frankston line at Glenhuntly station. Originally both were crossed by level crossing, however the former was eliminated in a grade separation project in October 1960, with the railway lines lowered below the road and a new station built.

Until recently the road was spelt "Glenhuntly Road" until it was officially changed to the present spelling.

Elsternwick shopping centre can be found on Glen Huntly Road. It is a strip shopping centre that offers restaurants, fashion outlets and other shops. Tram route 67 traverses Glen Huntly Road from the Nepean Highway to Carnegie. Glenhuntly tram depot is located on Glen Huntly Road.

See also

References

Elsternwick, Victoria
Shopping districts and streets in Australia
Streets in Melbourne
Transport in the City of Port Phillip
Transport in the City of Glen Eira